Tallinn (the capital city of then Estonian Soviet Socialist Republic) can refer to a number of Soviet cruisers:

 , an unfinished Soviet Navy , former German cruiser Lützow.
 , a Soviet Navy .

Soviet Navy ship names